The Samsung Rugby Smart (SGH-i847) was a ruggedized Android smartphone manufactured by Samsung, for use on the AT&T Mobility network. The phone was 3.5G capable, but lacked LTE support.

Reception 
The Samsung Rugby Smart was rated 4 stars out of 5 by PC Magazine and selected as their Editors' Choice. Phone Arena scored it 7½ out of 10. CNET rated the smartphone 3½ stars out of 5.

Samsung Galaxy Rugby Pro 

In October 2012, Samsung and AT&T announced the Samsung Galaxy Rugby Pro (SGH-i547), a successor to the Rugby Smart that includes similar durability and also ships with a scratch-resistant screen, something its previous model lacked. This rugged smartphone has passed military specification tests, like surviving blowing rain and sand, high humidity, and thermal shock. It comes with the push-to-talk features, but has LTE capability and a faster 1.5 GHz processor running Android 4.0 Ice Cream Sandwich.

Image gallery

See also 
 Casio G'zOne Commando
 Comparison of smartphones
 Samsung Galaxy
 Samsung Rugby

References

External links 
 
 
 Android Forums tutorial on how to root (destructive)
 XDA Forums tutorial on how to replace and use recoveries
 XDA Forums tutorial on how to install CyanogenMod 9
 XDA Forums tutorial on how to install CyanogenMod 10

Android (operating system) devices
Discontinued smartphones
Mobile phones introduced in 2012
Rugby Smart